is a railway station located in the eastern part of Itō, Shizuoka Prefecture, Japan operated by the private railroad company Izukyū Corporation.

Lines
Izu-Kōgen Station is served by the Izu Kyūkō Line, and is located 15.9 kilometers from the starting point of the line at Itō Station and 32.8 kilometers from Atami Station.

Station layout
The station has a side platform and an island platform serving three tracks, connected to the station building with a footbridge. The station is staffed.

Platforms

Adjacent stations

History 
Izu-Kōgen Station opened on December 10, 1961.

Passenger statistics
In fiscal 2017, the station was used by an average of 1516 passengers daily (boarding passengers only).

Surrounding area
 Izu-Kōgen resort area

See also
 List of Railway Stations in Japan

References

External links

 Official home page

Railway stations in Japan opened in 1961
Railway stations in Shizuoka Prefecture
Izu Kyūkō Line
Itō, Shizuoka